The 2009 King Cup of Champions, or The Custodian of the Two Holy Mosques Cup, was the 34th season of King Cup of Champions since its establishment in 1957, and the 2nd under the current edition.

Al-Shabab won their second title in a row after beating the same team they faced in last season's final Al-Ittihad with a 4–0 victory in the final match. Al-Shabab also earned entry into the 2010 AFC Champions League group stage.

Participating teams

* Number of appearance in King Cup of Champions since the 2008 season.

Fixtures and results

Bracket

Quarter-finals
Quarter-finals were played between 17 and 26 April 2009.

First leg

Second leg

Semi-finals
Semi-finals were played on 1 & 11 May 2009.

First leg

Second leg

Third Place
Third place game was played on 14 May 2009.

Final

Winner

References

External links
kooora.com-Arabic
goalzz.com-English

2009
2008–09 in Saudi Arabian football
2008–09 domestic association football cups